Aq Guni (also Romanized as Āq Gūnī; also known as Āghgūnī) is a village in Mehmandust Rural District, Kuraim District, Nir County, Ardabil Province, Iran.

Population
At the 2006 census, its population was 31, in 6 families.

References 

Towns and villages in Nir County